NG-13, previously known as OA-13, was the fourteenth flight of the Northrop Grumman robotic resupply spacecraft Cygnus and its thirteenth flight to the International Space Station (ISS) under the Commercial Resupply Services (CRS-1) contract with NASA. The mission launched on 15 February 2020 at 20:21:01 UTC after nearly a week of delays. This is the second launch of Cygnus under the CRS-2 contract.

Orbital ATK and NASA jointly developed a new space transportation system to provide commercial cargo resupply services to the International Space Station (ISS). Under the Commercial Orbital Transportation Services (COTS) program, then Orbital Sciences designed and built Antares, a medium-class launch vehicle, with Ukrainian specialists providing first stage structure.

Cygnus, an advanced maneuvered spacecraft, mates a Pressurized Cargo Module, provided by Orbital's industrial partner Thales Alenia Space, with their GEOStar satellite bus. Northrop Grumman purchased Orbital in June 2018; its ATK division was renamed Northrop Grumman Innovation Systems.

History 
Cygnus NG-13 is the second Cygnus mission under Commercial Resupply Services-2.

Production and integration of Cygnus spacecraft are performed in Dulles, Virginia. The Cygnus service module is mated with the pressurized cargo module at the launch site, and mission operations are conducted from control centers in Dulles, Virginia and Houston, Texas.

The original launch attempt on 9 February 2020 was scheduled to launch at 22:39:30 UTC before being pushed to the end of its five-minute window at 22:44:29 UTC, only to end up being scrubbed due to a technical issue with a regulator at the launch pad with three minutes left in the countdown. The second launch attempt on 14 February 2020 at 20:43:34 UTC was scrubbed due to strong upper winds with less than ninety minutes left in the countdown. Cygnus NG-13 was launched successfully on 15 February 2020 at 20:21:01 UTC.

Launch and early operations 
After Northrop Grumman purchased Orbital ATK in June 2018, the mission was changed from OA-13 to NG-13. The Antares rocket was built and processed in the Horizontal Integration Facility over the course of six months. The rocket was rolled out to MARS Pad 0A where it was originally planned to launch 9 February 2020 but was scrubbed and delayed due to inclement weather and an issue with a regulator at the launch pad. The mission launched successfully on the 15 February 2020 at 20:21:01 UTC with no delay and no apparent problems. The Cygnus spacecraft arrived at the space station on 18 February 2020 at 09:05 UTC. Expedition 62 astronaut Andrew Morgan grappled the spacecraft using the station's robotic arm. After Cygnus capture, ground controllers commanded the station's arm to rotate and install Cygnus on the Earth-facing port of the station's Unity module at 11:16 UTC. The Cygnus spacecraft remained at the space station until 11 May 2020. The Saffire-IV experiment was conducted within Cygnus after it departs the station, and prior to deorbit, when it disposed of several tons of trash during reentry into Earth's atmosphere, over the Pacific Ocean, on 29 May 2020.

Spacecraft 

This is the eighth flight of the Enhanced-sized Cygnus PCM. This Cygnus spacecraft is named to honor Robert H. Lawrence.

Manifest 
The Cygnus spacecraft is loaded with :

 Vehicle hardware:       
 Science investigations: 
 Crew supplies:          
 Spacewalk equipment:    
 Computer resources:     
 Total Cargo:            
 Total Pressurized Cargo with packaging:

Hardware 
NASA provided the following breakdown of the cargo's hardware for ISS:

 Columbus Ka-band Terminal (COLKa) Assembly: module enhancement hardware to upgrade the communications capability in Columbus science module
 Major Constituents Analyzer (MCA) Mass Spectrometer: critical spare to support laboratories and connecting module operations of the MCAs to detect atmospheric constituents on board the space station
 External High Definition Camera (EHDC) Assembly: major camera assembly spare that will replace a failed camera on-orbit during a spring 2020 EVA
 Water Stowage System (WSS) Resupply Tanks (RST): nine water tanks to support crew and hardware requirements during the 2020 timeframe
 Nitrogen/Oxygen Recharge System (NORS) Tanks: two recharge tanks to replenish on-orbit oxygen to be utilized in upcoming spacewalks, and one air tank to support the Commercial Crew Vehicle (CCV) Emergency Breathing Air Assembly (CEBAA) hardware launching in 2020
 POLAR Flight Assembly: cold stowage capability to support payload transportation to the ISS

Research 
The new experiments arriving at the orbiting laboratory will challenge and inspire future scientists and explorers, and provide valuable insight for researchers. Experiments will test new facilities for microscopic viewing and cell culturing, and particle identification will seek to better understand how fire spreads in microgravity and will study how bacteriophages behave in space. The Saffire-IV experiment will occur after Cygnus leaves the ISS.

 Mobile SpaceLab, a tissue and cell culturing facility that offers investigators a quick-turnaround platform to perform sophisticated microgravity biology experiments. This will be mounted in a designated EXPRESS rack on ISS 
 Mochii, initial demonstration of a new miniature scanning electron microscope (SEM) with spectroscopy
 Spacecraft Fire Experiment-IV (Saffire-IV), fourth in a series of experiments on fire and combustibles 
 OsteoOmics examines osteoblast cells at a molecular level to better understand bone loss 
 Phage Evolution studies the effects of microgravity and radiation exposure on bacteriophages and their hosts

Cubesats 
Cubesats planned for release: Red-Eye 2, DeMI, TechEdSat 10. A CubeSat payload for the communications provider Lynk (2020-011D) was ejected from the Slingshot deployer on Cygnus on 13 May 2020 at 23:25 UTC. Another payload (another Lynk, or perhaps WIDAR) remained attached to Cygnus and deployed a communications antenna. The payloads were launched aboard SpaceX CRS-20 and installed on the Cygnus hatch by the ISS crew. The Cygnus host a NASA combustion experiment inside its pressurized cabin before Northrop Grumman controllers command the spacecraft to a destructive re-entry over the South Pacific Ocean on 29 May 2020.

Disposal 
Cygnus NG-13 is another test of the Cygnus External Payload Carrier. Europe's HDEV experiment which has provided outstanding views of the Earth would return home on Cygnus NG-13.

See also 
 Uncrewed spaceflights to the International Space Station

References

External links 
 Spacecraft Fire Experiment-IV mission page
 Phage Evolution misson pag
 OsteoOmics mission page
 Mochii mission page
 Mobile SpaceLab mission page
 Footage of the pre-launch, launch and post-launch from NASA TV

Cygnus (spacecraft)
Supply vehicles for the International Space Station
Spacecraft launched in 2020
Spacecraft which reentered in 2020
Spacecraft launched by Antares rockets